Anisoptera thurifera is a tree species in the family Dipterocarpaceae.  This Asian species has been recorded from Bangladesh through to New Guinea; the IUCN has categorised it as Vulnerable.

Subspecies
The Catalogue of Life lists two subspecies:
 Anisoptera thurifera polyandra
 Anisoptera thurifera thurifera

References

thurifera
Flora of Malesia
Flora of Indo-China
Taxa named by Francisco Manuel Blanco
Taxa named by Carl Ludwig Blume